= Doug Caine =

Douglas Caine is an American and an addiction treatment professional, he is the founder of the rehabilitation facility Sober Champion. Many of his clients are Hollywood celebrities and the wealthy.

== About ==
In 2005, he opened a boutique sober coaching firm called Sober Champion. In 2007, he traveled to New York City and London, trained staff there and opened UK Sober Champion and New York Sober Companion. More recently, he traveled to Chicago and launched a local operation: Chicago Sober Champion.

Douglas opened a non-traditional mental health counseling practice in Santa Monica. Currently, he treats a wide variety of conditions in private practice, Connect With Douglas.
